Tokar, also transliterated Tawkar, is a town of 40,000 people near the Red Sea in northeastern Sudan. Tokar Game Reserve lies to the east of the town.

The high temperature mean daily value, in the month of July, can reach , the low temperature mean daily value does not go under . The only rain in Tokar falls in the months of November, December, January  and August. In the whole world only 48 locations are warmer than Tokar, and 166 are dryer.

The town lies in the delta of the Baraka River.  Since the 1860s cotton has been grown in the delta.

References

Populated places in Red Sea (state)